Friarton Hill is a hill located  south-southwest of Perth, Scotland, next to the M90 motorway.

References

Landforms of Perth, Scotland
Mountains and hills of Perth and Kinross